András Nemény (born 7 June 1976) is a Hungarian jurist and politician, member of the National Assembly from the Hungarian Socialist Party's National List between 2010 and 2014.

Nemény was a member of the Parliamentary Committee on Consumer Protection between 14 May and 1 June 2010. He was appointed a member of the Committee on Employment and Labour on 14 May 2010, holding the position until 5 May 2014.

References

1976 births
Living people
University of Pécs alumni
Hungarian jurists
Hungarian Socialist Party politicians
Members of the National Assembly of Hungary (2010–2014)
People from Szombathely